The Class EF67 is a class of electric locomotives operated by Japan Freight Railway Company (JR Freight) as dedicated banking locomotives on the steeply-graded "Senohachi" section of the Sanyo Main Line between  and . The class is subdivided into three EF67-0 locomotives converted between 1982 and 1984 from former Class EF60 locomotives, and five EF67-100 locomotives converted in 1990 from former Class EF65 locomotives.

EF67-0
Three EF67-0s were built from former 4th-batch Class EF60 locomotives from 1982 for use banking freight trains over 1,000 tonnes, for which the former EF61-200 banking locomotives were unsuitable. The No. 1 end was modified with a gangway door and access platform. The locomotives were painted in an all-over orange livery (officially "Red No. 11") with yellow strips below the cab windows. These three locomotives are fitted with PS22D scissors-type pantographs.

The EF67-0s were equipped with an automatic uncoupling mechanism at the No. 1 end to enable the banking locomotives to be uncoupled on the fly, but uncoupling while in motion was discontinued from the start of the 22 March 2002 timetable revision.

Conversion details
The EF67-0s were converted as shown below. , only EF67 1 remains in service.

EF67-100
Five EF67-100s were built from former 6th-batch Class EF65-0 locomotives from 1990 to replace the ageing EF61-200 banking locomotives. The EF67-100 fleet was refurbished between 2003 and 2004, and repainted into a revised livery with grey and white lines along the lower body side. These locomotives were originally fitted with PS22B scissors-type pantographs, which were replaced with single-arm pantographs on refurbishment, but these were subsequently returned to PS22B scissors-type pantographs.

Conversion details
The EF67-100s were converted as shown below.

See also
 Japan Railways locomotive numbering and classification
 JR Freight Class EF210-300, the EF210-based successor to the EF67

References

Further reading
 

Electric locomotives of Japan
EF67
Bo′Bo′Bo′ locomotives
Bo-Bo-Bo locomotives
1500 V DC locomotives
Railway locomotives introduced in 1982